Events from the year 1785 in Canada.

Incumbents
Monarch: George III

Governors
Governor of the Province of Quebec: Frederick Haldimand
Governor of Nova Scotia: Edmund Fanning
Commodore-Governor of Newfoundland: John Byron
Governor of St. John's Island: Walter Patterson

Events
 North West Company strengthened far west trade through such forts as Athabasca and English River.
 May 18: The city of Saint John, New Brunswick is incorporated. 
 Fredericton opens a Provincial Academy of Arts and Sciences, the germ of the University of New Brunswick (1859).
 New Brunswick is separated from Nova Scotia
 Du Calvet proposes Canadian representation in the British Parliament, three members, each, for the Districts of Quebec and Montreal.
 To a proposed Elective Legislature, it is objected that French Canadians do not wish to change their customary laws, and that there are not enough fit men to compose a Legislature.
 Isaac Brock takes command of the 49th Foot, which would be the backbone of the British Empire forces in Canada during the War of 1812.
 Mohawk Chapel, the oldest church in Ontario, was constructed near Brantford, Ontario.

Births
January 4: Louis-Théodore Besserer, notary, soldier, politician, and businessman (d.1861) 
January 30: Charles Metcalfe, 1st Baron Metcalfe, colonial administrator (d.1846)
February 4: Frédéric-Auguste Quesnel, politician, lawyer, and businessman (d.1866) 
February 15: William Crane, merchant, justice of the peace, judge, and politician (d.1853) 
April 27: Amable Éno, dit Deschamps, political figure (d.1875) 
September 17: Jacob De Witt, businessman, politician, and justice of the peace (d.1859) 
November 25: Andrew Stuart, lawyer, politician, office holder, and author (d.1840) 
December 14: Michel-Louis Juchereau Duchesnay, army and militia officer, seigneur, jp, and office holder (d.1838)

Full date unknown
William Abrams, businessman, jp, judge, office holder, and militia officer (d.1844)
François Lesieur Desaulniers, farmer and political figure (d.1870) 
John Heckman, political figure (d.1871) 
Caleb Hopkins, farmer and politician (d.1880)  
Peter Robinson, politician, Peterborough, Ontario renamed in his honour (d.1838)

 
Canada
85